Seize the Day is an album by Damien Dempsey released in Ireland in 2003 on Clear Records via Sony.  In the UK it was released via IRL and in the USA it was released on Attack Records a subsidiary of Sanctuary Records.  In the UK and USA, the title track was not hidden.

Two tracks – Factories and Seize the Day – appeared on the soundtrack to the Irish crime film Between The Canals, in which Dempsey made his debut acting performance.

Track listing
 "Negative Vibes" – 4:44
 "Ghosts of Overdoses" – 4:41
 "It's All Good" – 4:21
 "Factories" – 5:17
 "Jar Song" – 5:03
 "Celtic Tiger" – 5:13
 "Apple of My Eye" – 3:43
 "Industrial School" – 5:27
 "Great Gaels of Ireland" – 5:21
 "Marching Season Siege" – 3:24
 "Seize the Day" (hidden track) – 4:12

The tracks "Celtic Tiger", "It's All Good" and "Negative Vibes" feature backing vocals by Sinéad O'Connor.

Personnel
 Damien Dempsey (vocals, acoustic guitar, electric guitar)
 Brian Eno (guitar)
 Justin Adams (electric guitar)
 Paolo Baconi (slide guitar)
 Rob  Ó Géibheannaigh (banjo, flute, whistle)
 Kieran Kiely (whistle, accordion, piano, organ)
 Lucy Shaw (bass instrument)
 Clare Kenny (bass guitar)
 Emmet Dempsey (bodhrán)
 Sinéad O'Connor (background vocals)

External links
"Seize the Day" @ UFO

2003 albums
Damien Dempsey albums